Francesca Zunino (born 13 February 2000) is an Italian synchronised swimmer.

She won a silver medal in the free routine combination competition at the 2018 European Aquatics Championships.

References

2000 births
Living people
Italian synchronized swimmers
Artistic swimmers at the 2019 World Aquatics Championships
Artistic swimmers at the 2022 World Aquatics Championships
European Aquatics Championships medalists in synchronised swimming
World Aquatics Championships medalists in synchronised swimming
People from Savona
Sportspeople from the Province of Savona